The 2006 World Jiu-Jitsu Championship was held at Tijuca Tênis Clube, Rio de Janeiro, Brazil.

Results

Academy Results

External links 
 World Jiu-Jitsu Championship

World Jiu-Jitsu Championship